Igor Anatolyevich Khaymanov (born 26 March 1994) is a Russian football player.

Club career
He made his debut in the Russian Second Division for FC Alania-d Vladikavkaz on 26 April 2012 in a game against FC FAYUR Beslan.

He made his Russian Premier League debut for FC Alania Vladikavkaz on 26 May 2013 in a game against FC Spartak Moscow.

References

External links
 
 
 

1994 births
Sportspeople from Vladikavkaz
Living people
Russian footballers
Association football defenders
Association football midfielders
Russian expatriate footballers
Expatriate footballers in Belarus
FC Spartak Vladikavkaz players
Russian Premier League players
FC Fakel Voronezh players
FC Tyumen players
FC KAMAZ Naberezhnye Chelny players
FC Avangard Kursk players
FC Dynamo Bryansk players
FC Arsenal Dzerzhinsk players